Warren Spragg (born 1 November 1982 in Manchester) is an English-born Italian rugby union international. He is a versatile back and goalkicker.

Education
Warren Spragg was educated at Audenshaw School, he then went on to Kirkham Grammar School. He played for the school rugby union first XV in 1999/00 and 2000/01 when the school side went unbeaten.

Clubs
He started his career at Aldwinians RUFC before moving to Sale Sharks where he made his Guinness Premiership debut. He also helped Sale Sharks win the Melrose Sevens and Caldy 7s tournaments in 2003.

He then moved to Wakefield RFC where he won the 2003/04 Eva Orbell Trophy for best newcomer. On Wakefield's demise he moved to Orrell R.U.F.C.

He then played for Petrarca Padova Rugby in the Top12.

After moving to Fylde RFC to play he is now the head coach of the team playing in RFU National 2 North

Representative honours
While at Kirkham Grammar School, Warren was a member of the England Schools 18 group team that toured Australia and New Zealand in 2001. He scored a try in the England victory over the Australia Schoolboys.

He then represented the England under 21s in the 2002-03 U21 Six Nations Championship.

In the summer of 2004, he was a member of the England Counties XV squad that toured Canada.

In November 2006, he made his debut for Italy for whom he qualifies through an Italian grandmother. He has also represented Italy in the IRB Sevens World Series in 2007.

He also played for Lancashire Senior Team when they won the BIll Beaumont County Championship.

References

1982 births
Living people
British emigrants to Italy
English people of Italian descent
English rugby union players
Italian people of English descent
Italian rugby union players
Italy international rugby union players
Lancashire County RFU players
People educated at Kirkham Grammar School
Petrarca Rugby players
Rugby Calvisano players
Rugby union players from Manchester
Sale Sharks players
Wakefield RFC players
Rugby union wings